Perophora listeri is a species of colonial sea squirt in the genus Perophora, native to the North Atlantic.

Description
Perophora japonica is a colonial tunicate with small, rounded, translucent zooids connected by a network of stolons.

References

Enterogona
Animals described in 1835